is a professional Japanese baseball player. He plays infielder for the Tokyo Yakult Swallows.

References 

1995 births
Living people
Baseball people from Fukuoka Prefecture
Meiji Gakuin University alumni
Japanese baseball players
Nippon Professional Baseball infielders
Tokyo Yakult Swallows players